Kevin Julio Chandra or better known as Kevin Julio (born in Jakarta, Indonesia on July 28, 1993) is an Indonesian actor, presenter and singer of mixed Dutch and Sundanese descent.

Early life 
Kevin Julio was born on July 28, 1993, in Jakarta. He is the only child of Asep Candra Himawan and Nancy Wijaya. His father is Sundanese while his mother is of Dutch descent

Career 
Kevin started his film career as supporting roles in Basah... (2006), Menculik Miyabi (2010) and Bangun Lagi Dong Lupus (2013). His first leading role was in the Kembalinya Nenek Gayung (2013) and Adriana (2013). In 2016 he was cast as villain in the Comedy-superhero Jagoan Instan.

In 2013 he started his presenting career by co-hosting along with Olga Syahputra and Raffi Ahmad in the music program Dahsyat. In 2016 he hosting a new talent search or television show formed by FremantleMedia (now Fremantle) with NET., in between of Just Duet and Ini Dia! (Indonesian version of Thank God You're Here).

As an actor, he has earned Bandung Film Festival for Excellence Actor in a Lead Role (Television) in 2014, and has been nominated for SCTV Awards, Indonesia Kids Choice Awards, Infotainment Awards, and Insert Fashion Awards.

2006–11: Debut television and film 
Kevin started his acting career as supporting role in Indonesian soap opera "Intan" in 2016. 
He started his acting career as supporting role and starred in several television including "Heart Series" (2007), "Candy"(2007). 
In 2011 he starred in "Arti Sahabat", which made him an idol.

Kevin started his film career as supporting roles in "Basah..." (Wet...) (2006), "Menculik Miyabi" (Kidnapping Miyabi)(2010)

2012–present: Critical acclaim, debut presenting, and FTV 
In 2013 he was cast in the second season of Heart Series, "Heart Series 2". His first leading role was in the "Bidadari-Bidadari Surga" (Heaven Angels) (2013). He received critical acclaimed with his role as Tristan in Ganteng-Ganteng Serigala (Handsome Wolves) (2014) In 2015 GGS back with it second season titled, Ganteng-Ganteng Serigala (Returns), it set earlier before first season. Kevin and all main casts left the show because the production changed it whole story, but he then called back him for the last episode.

In 2013 while on a break from television series, Kevin Julio starred in numerous film television including Rute Cinta No. 23 which has nominated in Panasonic Gobel Awards 2015.

While he was on a break from television activity he was cast on Bangun Lagi Dong Lupus (2013) as supporting role Daniel, Acha Septriasa boyfriend, but due to his rude character toward Lupus her girlfriend left him. His first leading role was in the horror-comedy film Kembalinya Nenek Gayung (Nenek Gayung is Back)(2013) as Brandon. A popular actor who is tried to get his popularity back in alternative way. Then he starred in a historical-fiction film, Adriana (2013), as Sobar who is very serious person. In 2016 he was cast as villain in the comedy-superhero Jagoan Instan (Instant Hero), Romeo. Directed by Fajar Bustami, Jagoan Instan was filmed last year and released on Feb. 18. For this character he is uglified with false buck teeth. Due to tight scheduled he collapsed three times in one day during the shooting of this film.

In 2013 he started his presenting career by co-hosting along with Olga Syahputra and Raffi Ahmad in the music program Dahsyat. In 2016 he hosting a new Indonesian singing talent search produced by FremantleMedia with NET., "Just Duet" aired every Saturday and Sunday at 7:30 pm from April 2 – May 22, 2016.

On February 8, 2016, he wrote on his Twitter that he appointed as ALBA Watch Indonesia's Brand Ambassador.
  
On August 2, 2015, he along with Maia, PASTO, Jessica Mila and Prilly Latuconsina hold fan meeting in Jakarta Selatan to promoted their latest collaboration album, Maia Pasto with the Stars. He sung a duet track with PASTO, "Teman atau Kekasih" (Friend or Girlfriend) The official teaser of this track first published on July 27, 2015, by Le Mosiek Revole on YouTube

In November 2016, his film with Jessica Mila, Surga di Telapak Kaki Ibu (The Movie), was released. On January 12, 2017, Jomblo Ngenes, his second film with Mila was released. On June 25, 2017, Indonesian version of Miss Granny, Sweet 20, was released, starring Julio as Juna.

Filmography

Films

Television

Dramas

Television films 
 Cewek Super Lelet (2008) as Aruna
 Kacamata Kuda Buat Uda (2008) as Uda
 Rute Cinta No. 23 as Adit
 Rebutan Pembantu Cantik as Ardi
 Dikejar Argo Cinta as Adit
 Roro Jonggrang Millenium
 Labil Ekonomi Bikin Jatuh Cinta (2013) as Rianto 
 Tabrakan 2 Hati (2014) as Tommy
 Tak Ada Babysitter Supir Pun Jadi (2014) as Ciko
 Kepepet Cinta Cowok Jetset (2014) as Johan
 Cewek Jadul Bikin Happy (2014) as Reni
 Cintaku Dikoploin Kamu
 Tukang Babat Rumput Jatuh Cinta
 Hansip Super Tajir

Collaborations

Commercial film 
 Caviplex Junior
 Oppo (2014) (with Jessica Mila)
 ALBA Watch Indonesia (2016)

Presenter 
 Dahsyat
 Just Duet
 Ini Dia!
 Pesta Sahabat Cinta Indonesia (id:)

Accolades

References

External links 
 
 

Indo people
Indonesian people of Chinese descent
Indonesian television personalities
Male actors from Jakarta
21st-century Indonesian male actors
Indonesian male television actors
Living people
1993 births